The Blood List is a survey of unproduced thriller and horror scripts voted upon by industry professionals.  It is similar to the Black List and was created in 2009 by Kailey Marsh.  Steve Barton of Dread Central has called it "one of the most vital and necessary horror resources you'll ever need to break into the business".

History 
In 2013, they began offering a script-rating service.  The ten highest-rated scripts are forwarded to judges for possible inclusion in the Blood List.  The next year, they partnered with Stage 32 for a contest open to new writers who do not yet have representation.

Top-rated scripts

See also
 List of highest-grossing horror films

References

External links 
 

Film production
Unproduced screenplays
Horror film lists